Sophronius (c. 560 – March 11, 638), called Sophronius the Sophist, was the Patriarch of Jerusalem from 634 until his death. He is venerated as a saint in the Eastern Orthodox and Catholic Churches. Before rising to the primacy of the see of Jerusalem, he was a monk and theologian who was the chief protagonist for orthodox teaching in the doctrinal controversy on the essential nature of Jesus and his volitional acts.

Travels
Sophronius was born in Damascus around 560. He has been claimed to be of Byzantine Greek or Syriac descent. A teacher of rhetoric, Sophronius became an ascetic in Egypt about 580 and then entered the monastery of St. Theodosius near Bethlehem. Traveling to monastic centres in Asia Minor, Egypt, and Rome, he accompanied the Byzantine chronicler St. John Moschus, who dedicated to him his celebrated tract on the religious life, Spiritual Meadow (and whose feast day in the Byzantine Rite, is shared with Sophronius'). On the death of Moschus in Rome in 619, Sophronius accompanied the body back to Jerusalem for monastic burial. He traveled to Alexandria, Egypt, and to Constantinople in the year 633 to persuade the respective patriarchs to renounce Monoenergism, a heterodox teaching that espoused a single, divine energy in Christ to the exclusion of a human capacity for choice. Except for his synodal letter for the Third Council of Constantinople, Sophronius' extensive writings on this question are all lost.

Elected Patriarch
Although unsuccessful in his mission to condemn Monoenergism, Sophronius was elected patriarch of Jerusalem in 634. Soon after his enthronement he forwarded his noted synodical letter to Pope Honorius I and to the Eastern patriarchs, explaining the orthodox belief in the two natures, human and divine, of Christ, as opposed to Monoenergism, which he viewed as a subtle form of heretical Monophysitism (which posited a single divine nature for Christ). Moreover, he composed a Florilegium (“Anthology”) of some 600 texts from the Early Church Fathers in favour of the Christian tenet of Dyothelitism (positing both human and divine wills in Christ). This document also is lost.

Teachings
In his Christmas sermon of 634, Sophronius was more concerned with keeping the clergy in line with the Chalcedonian view of God, giving only the most conventional of warnings of the Saracen advance on Palestine, commenting that the Saracens already controlled Bethlehem. Sophronius, who viewed the Saracen control of Palestine as "unwitting representatives of God's inevitable chastisement of weak and wavering Christians", died soon after the fall of Jerusalem to the caliph Umar I in 637, but not before he had negotiated the recognition of civil and religious liberty for Christians in exchange for tribute - an agreement known as Umari Treaty. The caliph himself came to Jerusalem, and met with the patriarch at the Church of the Holy Sepulchre. Sophronius invited Umar to pray there, but Umar declined, fearing to endanger the Church's status as a Christian temple.

Beside polemics, Sophronius' writings included an encomium on the Alexandrian martyrs Cyrus and John in gratitude for an extraordinary cure of his failing vision. He also wrote 23 Anacreontic (classical metre) poems on such themes as the Muslim siege of Jerusalem and on various liturgical celebrations. His Anacreontica 19 and 20 seem to be an expression of the longing desire he had of the Holy City, possibly when he was absent from Jerusalem during one of his many journeys. The order of the two poems has to be inverted to establish a correct sequence of the diverse subjects. Arranged in this way, the two poems describe a complete circuit throughout the most important sanctuaries of Jerusalem at the end of the 6th century, described as the golden age of Christianity in the Holy Land. Themes of Anacreonticon 20 include the gates of Jerusalem (or Solyma), the Anastasis, the Rock of the Cross, the Constantinian Basilica, Mount Sion, the Praetorium, St. Mary at the Probatica, and Gethsemane. The Mount of Olives, Bethany, and Bethlehem come next in Anacreonticon 19.
Sophronius also wrote down the Life of St. Mary of Egypt, which is read on the fifth Thursday of Lent in the Byzantine Rite.

References

Further reading 
 D. Woods, 'The 60 Martyrs of Gaza and the Martyrdom of Bishop Sophronius of Jerusalem’, ARAM Periodical 15 (2003), 129–50. Reprinted in M. Bonner (ed.), Arab-Byzantine Relations in Early Islamic Times (Aldershot, 2005), 429–50.

External links
 St Sophronius the Patriarch of Jerusalem Orthodox icon and synaxarion
 References by Sophronius to Islam

Syrian Christian saints
560 births
638 deaths
7th-century patriarchs of Jerusalem
People from Damascus
Byzantine saints
Saints from the Holy Land
6th-century Byzantine writers
7th-century Byzantine writers 
7th-century Christian saints
7th-century Christian theologians
Byzantine hymnographers
Byzantine theologians
6th-century Byzantine monks
Ascetics
Christian poets
7th-century Byzantine monks
Eastern Catholic poets